Belarus sent a delegation to compete at the 2010 Winter Paralympics, in Vancouver. It fielded a total of nine athletes, each of whom will compete in both biathlon and cross-country skiing.

Biathlon 

Belarus sent nine delegates to participate in the biathlon event at the 2010 Winter Paralympics. The sole medalist was:

  Vasili Shaptsiaboi Men's 3 km pursuit, visually impaired

Cross-country skiing 

Nine athletes from Belarus entered the Cross-country events at the Paralympics, winning eight of the nine total medals Belarus won. The medalists are:

  Liudmila Vauchok Women's 5 km, sitting 
  Liudmila Vauchok Women's 10 km, sitting 
  Liudmila Vauchok Women's 1 km sprint, sitting 
  Liudmila Vauchok, Larysa Varona & Yadviha Skorabahataya Women's 3x2.5 Relay
  Larysa Varona Women's 5 km, standing
  Dzmitry Loban Men's 10 km, sitting 
  Yadviha Skorabahataya Women's 15 km, visually impaired
  Vasili Shaptsiaboi Men's 20 km, visually impaired

See also
Belarus at the 2010 Winter Olympics
Belarus at the Paralympics

References

External links
Vancouver 2010 Paralympic Games official website
International Paralympic Committee official website

Nations at the 2010 Winter Paralympics
2010
Paralympics